I Love New York is a reality television series featuring Tiffany "New York" Pollard on a quest to find her true love.  The series first aired on VH1 as a spin off to Flavor of Love, another relationship competition series, which featured Pollard as a finalist in two consecutive seasons.

The winner of the show's first season, Tango (Patrick S. Hunter), failed to deliver as New York's soul mate. When the second season aired, Tailor Made (George Weisgerber) was revealed as New York's chosen flame. (Weisgerber and Pollard later separated during the taping of New York Goes to Hollywood.)

In addition to Pollard, a host of other individuals from Flavor of Love, including "Sister" Patterson (Pollard's mother), appeared on the show to help Pollard choose the right man. Mauricio Sanchez played New York's assistant, "Chamo," during the first season.

The production of a second season of I Love New York was first announced during a commercial break for the April 29, 2007, episode of Flavor of Love Girls: Charm School. After I Love New York was wrapped up for season one, the house was used for another VH1 show, Flavor of Love Girls: Charm School.

On October 22, 2020, a reunion special titled I Love New York: Reunited was announced which premiered on November 23, 2020.

Spinoffs

I Love Money
A large number of contestants from Flavor of Love, Rock of Love, and I Love New York are brought together in a mansion in Mexico to compete in a co-ed battle of mental and physical challenges to win $250,000. I Love Money was filmed from February to March 2008, with the season premiere on July 6, 2008.

New York Goes to Hollywood
New York Goes to Hollywood began on August 4, 2008, and consisted of ten 30-minute episodes. The show starred New York as she went throughout Hollywood trying to find an acting job. To focus on her new mission, New York has to put her last conquest, Tailor Made, on the backburner as she tries to take on Tinseltown. At the end of the series, Pollard decided to keep auditioning for film work, stating she would continue to document her career search in "New York Goes to Hollywood: Part 2"; if her film career doesn't pan out, she has mentioned a possible return to reality-television dating with an "I Love New York 3."

Real Chance of Love
Brothers Ahmad (Real) and Kamal (Chance) Givens did not win I Love New York, but they were given a second chance in the spin-off Real Chance of Love, which premiered October 20, 2008. On the show, the horse-breeding, music-producing entertainer brothers (known as the Stallionaires) were the stars of their own reality dating competition. Seventeen female contestants participated in the show and taking part in various challenges. Each week, women are eliminated until the final episode, where Ahmad selected "Corn Fed" and Kamal selected no one. A second season has been confirmed by Vh1 and casting began in March 2009. The season premiered on August 3, 2009 and the finale was on October 26, 2009. On the second-season finale Ahmad selected "Doll" and Kamal selected "Hot Wingz". In 2015, Ahmad (Real) died from colon cancer at age 33 or 35.

New York Goes to Work
New York Goes to Work premiered on May 4, 2009. The reality show followed New York as she searched for a regular job. After the finale, viewers were asked to vote on what she should do next. The choices were: I Love New York 3, Take a vacation, or find a real job. America voted for I Love New York 3.

Frank the Entertainer... in a Basement Affair
A casting call was issued for a VH1 reality dating show starring Frank Maresca (The Entertainer). The show was tentatively entitled The Entertainer of Love but it was revealed on the VH1 Blog that the show was going to be called Frank the Entertainer... in a Basement Affair. The show premiered January 3, 2010.

See also

 The Bachelorette (2003)
 A Shot at Love with Tila Tequila (2007)
 Transamerican Love Story (2008)

References

External links
 

2007 American television series debuts
2000s American reality television series
2008 American television series endings
2000s American game shows
American dating and relationship reality television series
VH1 original programming
English-language television shows
Television shows set in Los Angeles
Television series by 51 Minds Entertainment